The Nation is a newspaper based in Blantyre, Malawi, owned by Nations Publications Limited. It began distribution on 26 July 1993, and became a daily newspaper on 11 July 1994, coming out on Mondays through Fridays. Its sister newspaper Saturday Nation, now called Weekend Nation, was launched in 1995.

The Nation Newspaper
The Nation began distribution in July 1993, and became a daily newspaper in 1994. It became an important voice against the one party rule and the MCP party during the transition to multi-party rule.

The Weekend Nation
The Weekend Nation is a weekly newspaper based in Blantyre, Malawi owned by Nation Publications Limited (NPL). The weekly version is The Nation. It was originally called Saturday Nation, and was launched in 1995.

Cochrane-Dyet 2011 cable controversy

In April 2011, the Weekend Nation published an article quoting a leaked diplomatic telegram from British High Commissioner Fergus Cochrane-Dyet in which he wrote that Malawian President Bingu wa Mutharika was "becoming ever more autocratic and intolerant of criticism". On 27 April 2011, Malawi's government declared Cochrane-Dyet persona non grata and expelled him from the country. The UK responded by expelling Malawi's acting high commissioner, Flossie Chidyaonga. British aid to Malawi was also cut off.

In October 2011, Mutharika apologized for the expulsion of Cochrane-Dyet and lifted his ban from Malawi. By November 2011, Cochrane-Dyet had not been sent back to Malawi and the British government had not decided whether or not to re-establish normal relations with Malawi. Relations between the two countries did not normalize until there was change of leadership in Lilongwe, in April 2012.

The Nation and Weekend Nation Online
The online version of the Daily and Weekend Nation began in 1998.

Fuko

The Nation launched its Chewa language and Tumbuka language development paper online which it distributes for free in rural areas. The paper partners with United Nations Population Fund, Total Land Care, Malawi Rural Finance Company and Pride Malawi.

Nations Publications Limited
The Nation and Weekend Nation are publications of Nations Publication Limited (NPL), which is located in Blantyre. NPL's parent company was founded by Aleke Banda after the 1993 referendum in Malawi. It was started with eight employees. This included Ken Lipenga, who served as the editor in chief until 1995. Its initial assets consisted of one car, two computers and two telephones. It currently has offices in Blantyre, Lilongwe, Mzuzu and Zomba.

Banda became the country's former agriculture minister and former vice president of the United Democratic Front (Malawi). In 2010, Mbumba Banda, Aleke Banda's daughter became the managing director after the death of her father.

Notable contributors
Mabvuto Banda, journalist
Rex Chikoko, investigative journalist
Desmond Dudwa Phiri, columnist, economist, sociologist, writer.

References

External links
The Nation official page.

Mass media in Malawi
Publications established in 1993
Newspapers published in Malawi
Mass media in Blantyre
1993 establishments in Malawi